Tom Jaine (born 4 June 1943) is a former restaurateur, a food writer and until recently the publisher of Prospect Books.

He was educated at Kingswood School (1955–1959) and at Balliol College, Oxford where he studied Modern history (1961–1964). He worked as an archivist from 1964 to 1973 and a restaurateur from 1974 to 1984. From 1984 to 1988, he organised the Oxford Symposium on Food and Cookery, and from 1989 to 1994 he waso editor of the annual Good Food Guide. From 1993 to 2016 he was the proprietor of Prospect Books, a prize-winning publishing company specialising in food and food history.

He is the author of four books and has written for  The Times, The Guardian, The Sunday Times, The Sunday Telegraph, The Evening Standard and many other newspapers and magazines. He has presented The Food Programme and appeared on it many times, has done interviews for the BBC, BBC TV, and ITV, and a series of programmes about food and cookery in the Balkans for BBC Radio 4.

He was Glenfiddich Restaurant Writer of the year in 1994, Glenfiddich Food Broadcaster of the year in 2000, and that same year he was also the winner of the top award: Glenfiddich Trophy for the best Wine and Food Writer of the year.

Bibliography

As author 
 Cooking in the Country by Tom Jaine and James Ravilious (Prospect Books 1986) 
 Cosmic Cuisine by Tom Jaine and Nich Campion (Harper Collins 1988) 
 Contributed to Traditional Country House Cooking edited by C. Anne Wilson (Weidenfeld & Nicolson 1993) 
 Building a Wood-fired Oven (Prospect Books 1996) 
 Making Bread at Home (Weidenfeld & Nicolson Illus. 1998)

As editor

Books 

 co-editor of the Oxford Companion to Food, 2nd and 3rd editions

Annual guides 
 Westcountry Cooking's Guide to Good Food in the West Country, (1999-2000) 
 The Good Food Guide from 1989 to 1994.

Periodicals 
 World Gastronomy, Journal of The International Wine and Food Society (London)
 Food and Wine, Journal of The International Wine and Food Society (London)
 Petits Propos Culinaires, since 2000.

As translator 
  The French Country Housewife: the first volume of Maison rustique des dames (1859) by Cora Millet-Robinet, translated with introduction by Tom Jaine. London: Prospect Books, 2017.

References

External links 
 

1943 births
Living people
British publishers (people)
British editors
Alumni of Balliol College, Oxford
People educated at Kingswood School, Bath
British food writers